William Orr House, also known as the Orr-Richter House, is a historic home located in Center Township, LaPorte County, Indiana.  It was built in 1875, and is a -story, Eastlake movement style brick dwelling, with Italianate and Gothic Revival style design elements.  It features a -story central tower with a mansard roof and full width front porch.

It was listed on the National Register of Historic Places in 1984.

References

Houses on the National Register of Historic Places in Indiana
Houses completed in 1875
Houses in LaPorte County, Indiana
National Register of Historic Places in LaPorte County, Indiana